The Indochinese fulvetta (Fulvetta danisi) is a bird species in the family Paradoxornithidae. Like the other typical fulvettas, it was long included in the Timaliidae genus Alcippe or in the Sylviidae. It was previously considered a subspecies of the spectacled fulvetta, F. ruficapilla.

It is found in Laos and Vietnam. Its natural habitat is temperate forests.

References

 Collar, N. J. & Robson, C. 2007. Family Timaliidae (Babblers)  pp. 70 – 291 in; del Hoyo, J., Elliott, A. & Christie, D.A. eds. Handbook of the Birds of the World, Vol. 12. Picathartes to Tits and Chickadees. Lynx Edicions, Barcelona.

Fulvetta
Fulvettas
Birds described in 1941